Oh My God, O My God, Oh My God! or Ohmigod may refer to:

 the first words of the Act of Contrition, a Christian prayer
 a common phrase frequently abbreviated as "OMG", often used in SMS messages and Internet communication, and sometimes euphemised as  "Oh my Goodness" or "Oh my Gosh". The first attested use of the abbreviation O.M.G. was in a letter from John Fisher, 1st Baron Fisher to Winston Churchill in 1917.

Film 
 Oh! My God, a 1998 film starring Bowie Lam
 Oh! My God (2006 film), a South Korean film
 Oh, My God, a Bollywood film of 2008
 Oh My God (2009 film), an American documentary film about religion by Peter Rodger
 Oh My God !, French title of British film Hysteria
 OMG – Oh My God!, a 2012 Indian film
 Oh My God (2013 film), a Louis C.K. comedy special
 Oh My God (2015 film), Chinese romantic comedy film

Music 
 Oh My God (band), an American indie rock band

Albums 
 Oh, My God! (Doug E. Fresh album), 1986
 Oh, My God! (Linda Sundblad album), 2006
 Oh My God (album), an album by Kevin Morby, 2019

Songs 
 "Oh My God" ((G)I-dle song), 2020
 "Oh My God" (Guns N' Roses song), 1999
 "Oh My God" (Ida Maria song), 2007
 "Oh My God" (Kaiser Chiefs song), 2004; covered by Mark Ronson with Lily Allen (2007)
 "Oh My God!" (The Moniker song), 2011
 "Oh My God" (A Tribe Called Quest song), 1994
 "Oh My God" (Adele song), 2021
 "Oh My God", by David Crowder Band from Give Us Rest
 "Oh My God", by Jars of Clay from Good Monsters
 "Oh My God", by Jay Z from Kingdom Come
 "Oh My God", by Michael Franti & Spearhead from Stay Human
 "Oh My God!", by NMB48 from Teppen Tottande!
 "Oh My God", by Pink from Try This
 "Oh My God", by St. Vincent from Actor
 "O My God", by the Police from Synchronicity

Other uses 
 Oh My God! (video game), a 1993 arcade puzzle game
 Oh-My-God particle, a particular case of an ultra-high-energy cosmic ray
 Oh My God, a Chinese esports organisation

Oh My Gods
The plural form may refer to:
 Oh My Gods!, a webcomic by Shivian Montar Balaris
 Oh. My. Gods. (2008 novel) young adult fantasy novel by Tera Lynn Childs

See also 
 Oh My Gawd!!!, a 1987 album by The Flaming Lips
 "Oh My Goodness", a 2011 song by Olly Murs
 Oh My Goddess (disambiguation)
 AMG (disambiguation) for "Ah My God" or "Ah My Goddess"
 OMG (disambiguation)
 Oh My (disambiguation)
 My God (disambiguation)
 Oh my gosh (disambiguation)